Gazdan (also Romanized as Gazdān; also known as Lordān) is a village in Jask Rural District, in the Central District of Jask County, Hormozgan Province, Iran. At the 2006 census, its population was 728, in 146 families.

References 

Populated places in Jask County